Roy Gathorne (21 August 1920 – 17 March 2016) was a South African cricketer. He played in six first-class matches for Eastern Province in 1952/53.

Michaelhouse cricket ground is named after him.

See also
 List of Eastern Province representative cricketers

References

External links
 

1920 births
2016 deaths
South African cricketers
Eastern Province cricketers
Sportspeople from Durban